The Conversion of Paul the Apostle is an event in the life of Paul the Apostle.

The Conversion of Paul the Apostle, Saint Paul, Paul, or Saul may also refer to:

Paintings
The Conversion of Saul (Michelangelo), a painting by Michelangelo completed in 1545
Conversion of Paul (Bruegel), a painting by Pieter Bruegel the Elder completed in 1567
The Conversion of Saint Paul (Caravaggio), a painting by Caravaggio completed in 1601, now in the Odescalchi Balbi Collection of Rome
Conversion on the Way to Damascus, a painting by Caravaggio completed later in 1601, now in the church of Santa Maria del Popolo, in Rome
The Conversion of Saint Paul (Maíno), a 1614 painting by Juan Bautista Maíno
The Conversion of Saint Paul (Murillo), a 1675-1680 painting by Bartolomé Esteban Murillo

Other uses
Conversion of St. Paul Church (Vermont), a parish in Vermont

Paul the Apostle